Chief is the third studio album by American country music artist Eric Church. It was released on July 26, 2011, via EMI Nashville. The album produced five singles, including Church's first two number one hits on the US Billboard Hot Country Songs chart—"Drink in My Hand" and "Springsteen", as well as the Top 10 hits "Creepin'" and "Like Jesus Does" and the Top 20 "Homeboy". On June 20, 2012, the album was certified triple Platinum by the RIAA, for having shipped over 3,000,000 records. As of April 2017, the album has sold 1,957,700 copies in the United States.

The album received a nomination for Best Country Album at the 54th Grammy Awards and won Album of the Year at the CMA Awards and ACM Awards. In 2020, the album was ranked at 419 on Rolling Stone's 500 Greatest Albums of All Time list.

Critical reception

Upon its release, Chief received generally positive reviews from most music critics. At Metacritic, which assigns a normalized rating out of 100 to reviews from mainstream critics, the album received an average score of 77, based on 9 reviews, which indicates "generally favorable reviews".

AllMusic reviewer Thom Jurek gave it 5 stars out of 5, saying that it is "defiant, well-conceived, and more carefully executed than it sounds, with some excellent songs". In a review for Slant Magazine, critic Jonathan Keefe stated that "It just doesn't make a hell of a lot of sense to champion traditional country music while singing over hard-rock arrangements and occasionally Auto-Tuned vocal tracks. That's not to say he doesn't do a lot of things, particularly with his songwriting and with some risky production choices, awfully well here. Chief doesn't make him a country music Jesus, but it does back up a good deal of his braggadocio."

Rolling Stone placed the album at number 19 on its Best Albums of 2011 list.

Commercial performance
The album debuted at number one on the US Billboard 200 and the Top Country Albums chart, selling 145,000 copies in its first week of release. In its second week, the album fell to number two on the Billboard 200 while still remaining at number one on the Top Country Albums chart.  The album was certified Platinum by the Recording Industry Association of America (RIAA) on June 20, 2012, and  triple platinum on August 31, 2016 for combined sales and streams of over three million units in the United States. As of August 2017, the album has sold 1,957,700 copies in the United States.

Track listing

Personnel
Adapted from AllMusic.

Musicians
 Stephanie Chapman – background vocals
 Eric Church – lead vocals, Dobro, acoustic guitar, electric guitar
 J. T. Corenflos – electric guitar
 Joanna Cotten – background vocals
 Shelly Fairchild – background vocals
 Steve Fishell – lap steel guitar, pedal steel guitar
 Jason Hall – background vocals
 Lee Hendricks – bass guitar
 Jedd Hughes – acoustic guitar, banjo, mandolin
 Jeff Hyde – acoustic guitar, banjo, background vocals
 Jay Joyce – acoustic guitar, electric guitar, 12-string guitar, Dobro, synthesizer
 Jaime King – background vocals
Luke Laird – acoustic guitar
 Alfreda McCrary Lee – background vocals
 Beverly Ann McCrary – background vocals
 Regina McCrary – background vocals
 Pat McLaughlin – acoustic guitar, electric guitar, background vocals
 Giles Reaves – vibraphone
 Jonathan Singleton – background vocals
 Bryan Sutton – acoustic guitar, banjo, mandolin
 Ryan Tyndell – background vocals
 Charlie Worsham – electric guitar, mandolin
 Craig Wright – drums, percussion

Technical
 Arturo Buenahora, Jr. – executive production
 Joanna Carter – art direction
 Jason Hall – assistant, engineer
 Michelle Hall – art production
 Scott Johnson – production assistant
 Jay Joyce – production, engineer, mixing
 Andrew Mendelson – mastering
 John Peets – photography
 Matt Wheeler – assistant

Charts

Weekly charts

Year-end charts

Decade-end charts

Certifications

References

2011 albums
Eric Church albums
EMI Records albums
Albums produced by Jay Joyce